Germán Rodrigo Basualdo (born 7 March 1984) is an Argentine football midfielder who plays for Deportivo Laferrere.

Career
Basualdo began his professional playing career in 2002 with Nueva Chicago making his league debut on 5 July 2003 in a 0-3 home defeat to Banfield. In 2004Nueva Chicago were relegated to the Argentine 2nd division, he remained with the club for another two seasons playing in the 2nd tier.

In 2006, he joined newly promoted Primera División debutants Tiro Federal where he was a regular first team player, but he could not help them to avoid relegation at the end of the season.

After a season with Gimnasia de La Plata between 2006 and 2007 he joined Almirante Brown of the 2nd división to help them battle against their mammoth 30 point deduction for crowd violence the previous season. Again Basualdo was a player in a relegated team but his performances were good enough to earn him a move to Spanish side  Pontevedra CF in 2008.

In 2009, he joined Chacarita Juniors and helped them to secure promotion to the Primera División.

Later in 2009 he was signed by new Argentinos Juniors manager Claudio Borghi. He did not make many first team appearances in the Apertura, but in the Clausura 2010 championship he featured in almost half of the games, helping the club to secure their first Primera División title since 1985.

Titles
Argentinos Juniors 
 Argentine Primera División (1): Clausura 2010

External links
 
 BDFA profile 
 
 

1984 births
Living people
Footballers from Buenos Aires
Argentine footballers
Association football defenders
Nueva Chicago footballers
Tiro Federal footballers
Club de Gimnasia y Esgrima La Plata footballers
Pontevedra CF footballers
Chacarita Juniors footballers
Argentinos Juniors footballers
Club Atlético Los Andes footballers
Deportivo Laferrere footballers
Argentine Primera División players
Primera Nacional players
Argentine expatriate sportspeople in Spain
Expatriate footballers in Spain